Norrvalla Fotbollförening (abbreviated Norrvalla FF) is a football club from Vörå, Finland. The club was formed in 1996 and their home ground is at the Vörå Centralplan.

Background

Norrvalla Fotbollförening was founded in 1996 after several meetings between representatives from the Vörå IF, Oravais IF, Maxmo Sportklubb and Hellnäs Bollklubb clubs. The idea was to create an organisation specializing in football.

The formal decision to found the club was finally made at a meeting held on 24 November 1996. A business plan was approved with the following objectives for 1997:

– To achieve an efficient organization
– To create their own identity so that all might know: "This is my football club"
– To create a working relationship with the parent clubs
– To create a sustainable economy for the new club
– On a sporting basis to create a solid platform to stand on for the coming year

Over the years the club has achieved these initial goals although many challenges remain.   Norrvalla FF has its base at the Norrvalla Folkhälsans Rehabilitation Centre, where the bulk of training takes place, especially during winter, spring and autumn. Matches are played on artificial turf.

In their early years Norrvalla FF played in the lower levels of Finnish football. They played 3 seasons in the third tier, the Kakkonen (Second Division), in 2007 to 2009. However the 2009 season ended in disappointment when they were relegated back to the Kolmonen (Third Division).

Season to season

3 seasons in Kakkonen
13 seasons in Kolmonen
5 seasons in Nelonen

Club structure

Norrvalla Fotbollförening run a number of teams including adult teams and a number of junior teams for boys and girls.

Footnotes

External links
Official Club Website
Finnish Wikipedia
 Suomen Cup
Norrvalla FF Facebook

Football clubs in Finland
Association football clubs established in 1996
1996 establishments in Finland